Freamunde  is a Portuguese parish  in the municipality of Paços de Ferreira. The population in 2011 was 7,789, in an area of 5.15 km².

Sports
The main sport in Freamunde is football and the main team is S.C. Freamunde.

References

Freguesias of Paços de Ferreira